The Canton–Hong Kong strike was a strike and boycott that took place in British Hong Kong and Guangzhou (Canton), Republic of China,  from June 1925 to October 1926.  It started out as a response to the May 30 Movement shooting incidents in which Chinese protesters were fired upon by Sikh detachments of the Shanghai Municipal Police in Shanghai.

Incident

On May 30, 1925, Sikh detachments of the Shanghai Municipal Police opened fire on a crowd of Chinese demonstrators at the Shanghai International Settlement.  At least nine demonstrators were killed, and many others wounded. Escalating the incident, on June 23, 1925, a heated demonstration in Shameen Island took place which resulted in the Shakee Massacre.  Troops under foreign command, perceiving shots being fired at them, killed more than fifty Chinese protesters and wounded almost two hundred more.

Strike
Prominent Chinese citizens in Guangdong called for an anti-British strike, especially in Hong Kong, then a British colony.  The Kuomintang leaders and Soviet advisors even considered attacking the Anglo-French Settlement in Shameen.  Anti-British pamphlets were passed around in Hong Kong. Rumours also spread that the colonial government planned to poison the colony's water supplies. Guangdong offered free train passage to Hong Kong. In the first week of protest, more than 50,000 Chinese citizens left Hong Kong.  Food prices soared.  The colony was a ghost town by July.  By the end of July, some 250,000 Chinese left for Guangdong.  The worst of the strike was over by 1926.

Government and economy
The British government had to provide a trade loan of 3 million pounds to prevent the economy from collapsing. Hong Kong's top two colonial officials, Governor Sir Reginald Stubbs and Colonial Secretary Claud Severn, were replaced in 1925 as a consequence of the crisis, under criticism from James Jamieson, the British Consul General in Canton. Jamieson claimed the two were out of touch and out of date, unable to converse in Chinese and were ignorant of the political situation in China.

An anti-British boycott continued for several more months.  The economy was paralysed and Hong Kong's total trade fell by 50%, shipping diminished by 40%, and rents decreased by 60%, which lasted until the end of the boycott.

In literature
The Canton–Hong Kong strike plays a prominent part in André Malraux's first novel, The Conquerors (1928).

See also
History of colonial Hong Kong
History of the Republic of China
Su Zhaozheng
1922 seamen's strike

References

1925 in Hong Kong
1926 in Hong Kong
1925 in China
1926 in China
British Hong Kong
Riots and civil disorder in Hong Kong
History of Guangzhou
Labour movement in China
1925 labor disputes and strikes
1926 labor disputes and strikes
China–United Kingdom relations
Hong Kong–United Kingdom relations
Political repression in Hong Kong
Events in Guangzhou